Bëyuk-Oriyat (also, Beyuk-Or’yat, Bol’shoy Oriat, and Oriyat) is a village in the Neftchala Rayon of Azerbaijan.

References 

Populated places in Neftchala District